Chor Nikal Ke Bhaga  is an upcoming Hindi heist film directed Ajay Singh produced by Amar Kaushik. It stars Yami Gautam and Sunny Kaushal in the lead roles. The film is scheduled to release on 24th March 2023 via Netlfix Platform.

Premise 
A flight attendant and her boyfriend hatch a plan to steal a stash of diamonds in order to pay off an outstanding debt. However, while soaring 40,000 feet in the air, their scheme takes a disastrous turn, resulting in a hostage crisis.

Cast 

 Yami Gautam as Neha Grover
 Sunny Kaushal as Ankit Sethi
 Sharad Kelkar 
 Indraneil Sengupta

Release 
The film is scheduled to be released on Netflix on 24 March 2023.

Music 
The music for the film is composed by Vishal Mishra.

References

External links 
 
 

2020s Hindi-language films
2023 films
Films set on airplanes
Hindi-language Netflix original films